Terry Mills may refer to:

 Terry Mills (basketball) (born 1967), American basketball player
 Terry Mills (American politician) (born 1950), Kentucky state legislator
 Terry Mills (Australian politician) (born 1957), Northern Territory politician